The t Gulden Zeepaert, usually referred to as the Gulden Zeepaert (The Golden Seahorse) was a ship belonging to the Dutch East India Company (VOC). It sailed along the south coast of Australia from Cape Leeuwin in the south west of Western Australia to the Nuyts Archipelago in South Australia early in 1627.

The Captain was François Thijssen.

Details of the voyage
The Gulden Zeepaert (Golden Seahorse) sailed from the Netherlands on 22 May 1626, under the command of Francois Thijssen (sometimes recorded as Thijszoon or Thyssen). Also on board was Pieter Nuyts, extraordinary member of the Dutch East India Company's Council of India, their executive body in the East Indies.

It appears that in January 1627 the vessel encountered the Southland in the vicinity of Cape Leeuwin. They reached St. Francis and St. Pieter Islands in what is now known as the Nuyts Archipelago, off Ceduna in South Australia. Thijssen mapped the coastline around Fowlers Bay.

What transpired during this part of the voyage is not known in detail as no log survives. The principal evidence consists of contemporary maps, a brief reference to the voyage in the Daily Register at Batavia for 1627, and in instructions to Gerrit Thomaszoon Pool in 1636 and Abel Tasman in 1644.

The Gulden Zeepaert reached Batavia on 10 April 1627. Records indicate that 30 men died during the voyage. The region they encountered became known as Nuyts Land. Nuyts had also been on board the Leeuwin which sighted and named Cape Leeuwin in 1622. According to the Landings List compiled by the Australia on the Map Division of the Australasian Hydrographic Society, the Gulden Zeepaert was the 13th recorded European contact with Australia.

Notes

References
 J. E. Heeres. The Part Borne by the Dutch in the Discovery of Australia, London: Luzac & Co, 1899, p. 51.

External links 
 The Part Borne by the Dutch in the Discovery of Australia

1620s ships
Ships of the Dutch East India Company